Arakkunnam is a small town in Ernakulam district of Kerala. Nearby piravom . It comes under the Edakkattuvayal and Mulanthuruthy panchayats and Kanayannur Taluk administration.

Location

Major Institutions
 Toc H Institute of Science and Technology
 A P Varkey Mission Hospital, Arakkunnam
 Govt. Health Center, Arakkunnam
 St. George High School, Arakkunnam
 St. George LP School, Arakkunnam

Places of worship
St. George's Jacobite Syrian Valiyapally, Arakkunnam
St. Joseph Church Arakkunnam
 Oozhacode Sree Krishna Swami Temple

References
Wikimapia link

Cities and towns in Ernakulam district